C.A.I. First S.p.A. was an Italian airline operating flights for its parent company, Alitalia, to preserve slots at Milan Linate Airport. For this reason Alitalia when merged with Air One didn't close C.A.I. First, which at that time still operated as Alitalia Express. It used to have bases at Leonardo da Vinci-Fiumicino Airport in Rome and Malpensa Airport in Milan. C.A.I. First was dissolved and merged into Alitalia mainline by February 2015.

The name C.A.I. First was only a legal name and wasn't used in public, all of its flights were branded as Alitalia.

History

Early years

The airline was established as a subsidiary of Alitalia and started operations on 1 October 1997. It was founded from the defunct Avianova. It was announced that Minerva Airlines would be acquired by Alitalia in March 2003 and that Alitalia Express's fleet would be transferred, but the plan did not go through.

Air One and Alitalia merger
In December 2008, Compagnia Aerea Italiana (C.A.I.) took over Alitalia - Linee Aeree Italiane and Air One, merging the two companies together to create the "new Alitalia". With the take over, CAI also received Alitalia Express and Air One CityLiner. The Alitalia Express brand has been phased out and the regional arm of Alitalia is now Alitalia CityLiner by rebranding Air One CityLiner.

The last fleet of Alitalia Express, 10 Embraer 170, was completely phased out by March 2013. Only one Airbus A320-200 (EI-DSC) from mainline Alitalia was moved in the fleet to preserve the slots. The same solution had been used with C.A.I. Second which used to be Volareweb.com.

On 6 February 2015, the airline was dissolved and its operations integrated into Alitalia mainline.

Fleet 
Prior to its shutdown in February 2015, the fleet consisted of the following aircraft:

Fleet history 
Over the years, Alitalia Express has operated the following aircraft types:

See also
 List of defunct airlines of Italy

References

External links

Airlines established in 1997
Airlines disestablished in 2015
Alitalia
Defunct airlines of Italy
Italian companies established in 1997
Italian companies disestablished in 2015
Former SkyTeam affiliate members